Reuben Phillips (born 5 January 1992 in London) is an English professional squash player. As of February 2018, he was ranked number 120 in the world.

References

1992 births
Living people
English male squash players